Pechell may refer to:

People
Pechell baronets, including a list of people
George Brooke-Pechell (born George Richard Pechell; 1789–1860), British Royal Navy officer and Whig politician
Gladys Brooke-Pechell (1894–1974), visual artist, novelist and poet
George Pechell Mends (1815–1871), English sailor and amateur artist
John Pechell (1630–1690), English academic, Master of Magdalene College, Cambridge, Vice-Chancellor of the University of Cambridge
Mark Robert Pechell (1830–1902), British Royal Navy officer during the Crimean War 1854–1855
Paul Pechell (1724–1800), army officer, descendant of minor Huguenot nobility of Languedoc
Samuel Pechell CB, KCH, FRS (1785–1849), British Royal Navy officer

Geography
Mount Pechell, a peak in the Anare Mountains of Antarctica

See also
Pachal (disambiguation)
Pachil
Pecel
Pechüle